The 68th Indianapolis 500 was held at the Indianapolis Motor Speedway in Speedway, Indiana on Sunday May 27, 1984. Rick Mears, who previously won in 1979, won his second (of four) Indy 500 victories driving for Penske. Contenders Tom Sneva and Mario Andretti dropped out of the race in the second half, leaving Mears alone two laps ahead of the field, and he cruised to the victory. Three months after the race, however, Mears would suffer severe leg injuries in a practice crash at Sanair.

Three rookies finished in the top five: Roberto Guerrero (2nd), Al Holbert (4th), and Michael Andretti (5th). Guerrero and Andretti shared the rookie of the year award. The race is well-remembered for the terrible crash of sportswriter-turned-racer, Pat Bedard, who tumbled through the infield in turn 4 on lap 58. Another rookie, two-time World Champion and future two-time Indy winner Emerson Fittipaldi made a quiet debut.

The race was sanctioned by USAC, and was included as part of the 1984 CART PPG Indy Car World Series. The 1984 race has the distinction of having the record for most entries (117), and the most cars to actually be seen in the garage (87). Defending race winner Tom Sneva, who broke the 200 mph barrier during time trials in 1977, headlined qualifying on pole day. Sneva made history once again, as he became the first driver to break the 210 mph barrier, en route to his third pole position. This Indy 500 was the last for 33 years that an active Formula One driver, Teo Fabi, featured in the field, with double World Champion Fernando Alonso making his 500 debut in 2017.

Race schedule

Time trials

Pole Day – Saturday May 12
Pole Day was a historic day as Tom Sneva broke the track record with the first lap over 210 mph at Indy. Sneva was also the first driver to break the 200 mph barrier, which he accomplished during time trials in 1977. Nonetheless, going into Pole Day, Mario Andretti was actually the favorite for the pole position, after he ran a practice lap of 212 mph.

Rick Mears was the first driver in the field, completing his run with a track record of 207.847 mph. Rookie Michael Andretti was the next car out (207.805 mph), running surprisingly close to Mears. At 12:45 mph, Mario Andretti took to the track, with high expectations. His first lap was completed at 209.687 mph, a new one-lap track record. His second and third laps dropped off, however. As he came out of turn four on the fourth and final lap, his car quit. He coasted across the finish line powerless to complete the run, but the average speed sank to 207.467 mph. It would be good enough for row 2, but a disappointment compared to his practice speeds earlier in the week.

Shortly before 2 p.m., Tom Sneva took to the track, and electrified the crowd. His third lap was run at 210.423 mph, a new track record, and the first qualifying lap ever at Indy over 210 mph. His fourth lap (210.689) mph was the fastest. His four-lap speed of 210.029 mph was a record, and secured him the pole position. It was Sneva's third Indy pole, and fourth time overall as the fastest qualifier.

Later in the day, Howdy Holmes squeezed onto the front row with a run of 207.977 mph. It put him in second starting position, and bumped Rick Mears to the outside of the front row. Rookie Michael Andretti out-qualified his father, and would line up in 4th position (Mario qualified 6th).

A total of 28 cars qualified on pole day.

Second Day – Sunday May 13
Rain kept the track closed until nearly 1 p.m. Only three cars made attempts all afternoon, but none of them were run to completion. Johnny Rutherford went out for his second attempt in a Foyt entry, but never completed a lap due to mechanical problems.

During a practice run, John Paul Jr. wrecked in turn four, suffering leg injuries.

Third Day – Saturday May 19
The day began with five spots remaining unfilled on the grid. With rain in the forecast for Sunday, several teams scrambled to get their cars prepared to qualify on this day. Bill Alsup was the first driver to make an attempt, but his crew waved off.

George Snider was the first driver to complete his run, putting in a safe run of 201.860 mph in a Foyt backup car. Later, Steve Chassey wrecked on the first lap of his qualifying attempt. He would sit out the rest of the month with a concussion.

At 1 p.m. the field was filled to 33 cars. Chris Kneifel (199.831 mph) was on the bubble. Among the drivers still not in the field was three-time winner Johnny Rutherford. He was struggling to get his car up to speed, and exhausted his three allotted attempts in a Foyt Chevy V-6. The team bought a back-up car from Galles, and Rutherford immediately began shaking the car down. Rutherford was in danger of missing the race for the second year in a row. In 1983, he was sidelined with a broken foot and broken ankle from a practice crash.

At 5:50 p.m., with only ten minutes left before the 6 o'clock gun, Johnny Rutherford took to the track for one last attempt to qualify. His first lap was an impressive 203.156 mph, but the car began smoking throughout. Rutherford decided to ride it out, and he was not black-flagged. His speed dropped over the final three laps, but his four-lap average of 202.062 mph was fast enough to bump his way into the field.

Spike Gehlhausen (200.478 mph) was now on the bubble. Gary Bettenhausen made a last-ditch effort to bump him out, but he waved off after only two laps.

Bump Day – Sunday May 20
As expected, rain washed out the final day of time trials. Since the field had been filled to 33 cars a day earlier, the field was set, and there would be no further qualifying.

Jacques Villeneuve, who suffered a crash during practice, withdrew from the starting field due to injury. The first alternate, Chris Kneifel was re-instated to the field to fill the vacancy. He became the last driver to start the Indianapolis 500 with a qualifying speed under 200 mph.

Starting grid

Qualified cars withdrawn
Jacques Villeneuve (#76) – Withdrew qualified car due to practice crash

Alternates
First alternate: Chris Kneifel (#73) - Bumped; Named to the starting field on 5/24
Second alternate: none

Failed to qualify

Stan Fox  (#24) – Too slow, waved off
Gary Bettenhausen (#8, #60, #82) – Too slow, waved off
Tom Bigelow (#75) – Car quit during qualifying attempt
Pete Halsmer (#11) – Too slow, waved off
Roger Mears (#55, #76) – Too slow, waved off
Steve Chassey (#56, #65) – Wrecked during qualifying attempt
Johnny Parsons (#34, #59) – Incomplete qualifying attempt
Bill Alsup (#27) – Too slow, waved off
Ed Pimm (#64) – Incomplete qualifying attempt
Phil Caliva  (#69) – Incomplete qualifying attempt
Jim Crawford (#68, #78) – Too slow, waved off
Mike Chandler (#88) – Practice crash, injured
John Paul Jr. (#12) – Practice crash, injured
Steve Krisiloff (#87) – Practice crash, injured
Jerry Sneva (#66) – Practice crash, injured
Larry Cannon (#81) – Practice crash
Chuck Ciprich  (#36)
Dick Ferguson (#31, #51)
Chet Fillip (#38)
Bruno Giacomelli  (#52)
Jerry Karl (#59)
Phil Krueger (#85)
Desiré Wilson  (#34)
Al Loquasto (#86) – Withdrew; team sold car to GTS Racing for Emerson Fittipaldi

Race summary

Start
Race day dawned cool and clear, with temperatures in the 60s. Rain was forecast for later in the afternoon, but was not expected to affect the race. Mary F. Hulman gave the command to start engines just before 11 a.m., and all cars pulled away for the pace laps.

At the start, Rick Mears got the jump and swept across the track to take the lead in turn one. Pole sitter Tom Sneva settled into second, and rookie Michael Andretti went from the inside of row 2 to take third. Mears led the first lap at a speed of 195.610 mph, a new Indy record for the opening lap. Geoff Brabham ducked into the pits after one lap, dropping out with a bad fuel line.

A few laps later, Michael Andretti passed Tom Sneva to take second place. Gordon Johncock also went to the pits for an unscheduled pit stop.

First half

The first 100 miles were run clean, with no incidents. Tom Sneva led Al Unser Jr., Rick Mears, Mario and Michael Andretti.

After 37 laps, race rookie and future two-time winner Emerson Fittipaldi dropped out due to low oil pressure. The two-time Formula One World Champion had a relatively quiet month of May, acclimating himself gradually to the Indy car circuit. It was a largely unnoticed effort in the underfunded W.I.T. Promotions entry, a pink-painted car. On lap 45, Spike Gehlhausen spun in turn 1, and came to a rest in turn 2 without contact.

Rick Mears took the lead for the second time on lap 54. On lap 58, Patrick Bedard suffered a terrible crash in turn four. The car spun to the inside of the north shortchute, hit the inside wall, flipped over, and barrel-rolled through the grass. The car broke into two pieces, the tub and the engine. Debris littered the track, and a lengthy caution was needed to clean up the incident. Bedard was injured, but the injuries were not life-threatening. Under the caution, Danny Sullivan came up too fast and ran into the car of Roberto Guerrero, hopping up on two wheels, and damaging his right-front suspension. Sullivan dropped out of the race, but Guerrero was able to continue.

The lead traded amongst Mears, Sneva, Mario Andretti, Teo Fabi, and Danny Ongais. After the lengthy caution for Bedard's crash, Tom Sneva came to the lead, and led at the halfway point. Around lap 70, the DataSpeed computer timing and scoring system crashed. The remainder of the race would have to be scored manually, and the scoring serials were at times incomplete. However, at no point was the leader of the race unknown or disputed.

Second half
At lap 100, Tom Sneva led, looking for back-to-back wins. Al Unser Jr. was in second, Rick Mears third, Mario Andretti fourth, and Michael Andretti fifth. The rest of the top ten was Bobby Rahal, Roberto Guerrero, Al Holbert, Al Unser, Sr., and Teo Fabi. Four laps later, however, Fabi was out with a broken fuel system.

On lap 103, Gordon Johncock hit the wall coming out of turn four. He spun to the inside, hit the pit wall, then spun back across the pits and hit the wall separating the pits from the track. He missed hitting Teo Fabi's car, which was being pushed back to the garage, and somehow missed hitting the crew members that were in the sign board area. Johncock injured his left ankle (he had suffered a right ankle injury at Michigan the previous year), and ultimately took a short retirement from racing.

With Rick Mears now leading, Mario Andretti started slipping in the standings due to a broken exhaust pipe. The engine was losing rpm, but he was still managing to stay in contention. After running in the top five most of the day, Al Unser Jr. dropped out on lap 131 with a broken water pump.

Tom Sneva briefly took the lead on laps 142-143 during a sequence of pit stops. Rick Mears was back in front on lap 144. With 50 laps to go, Rick Mears led Tom Sneva and Roberto Guerrero. Al Unser Sr. had now worked his way into the top five. Michael Andretti and Mario Andretti were also still in contention.

On lap 153, Mario Andretti went into the pits for a routine stop. He was held up in traffic, and the car of Josele Garza cut in front of him down the pit lane. Garza's car made contact, and broke the nosecone of Mario's car. It was too damaged to continue, and Mario was forced to drop out.

Finish
With several contenders dropping out in quick succession, the race came down to two drivers in the final 100 miles: Rick Mears and Tom Sneva. Scott Brayton stalled on the track on the leader's lap 163, bringing out the caution. With 33 laps to go, Sneva's crew debated pitting, hoping to make it to the finish on one more stop. They planned on pitting with 30 laps to go. On lap 168, however, sparks came from the back of Sneva's car in turn 3 as the field was preparing to go back to green. Sneva immediately ducked into the pits with a broken CV joint, and he climbed from the car. Mears, post-race, would remark, "I feel bad for him, but it's a relief for me...he was my toughest competitor."

With Sneva out of the race, Rick Mears now held a commanding lead. No other cars were in contention, with Mears now two laps ahead of the entire field. Mears cruised to the finish, and was not challenged the rest of the way. The only battle remained for second place, between Roberto Guerrero and Al Unser Sr.

A light drizzle started entering the area in the final 30 laps or so, threatening to end the race early. The heavy rain did not come, and Mears completed the 200 laps at a race record 163.612 mph. Mears won his second Indy 500, with a margin of victory of over two laps. Due to the ongoing scoring issues from the DataSpeed timing and scoring system, Al Unser Sr. was tentatively hand scored in second, with Roberto Guerrero unofficially third. For a brief period, it was Penske Racing's first 1-2 finish in the Indy 500. However, when scoring was ultimately resolved, Guerrero was rightfully elevated to second, with Unser dropping to third. After an eventful day - nearly being caught up in the Bedard crash, being hit by Sullivan during the ensuring yellow flag, overshooting his pit stall during one of his stops, and spinning in turn two - Guerrero was surprised to find out he finished second, and was voted co-Rookie of the Year.

Box score

Statistics

Broadcasting

Radio
The race was carried live on the IMS Radio Network. Paul Page served as the chief announcer for the eighth year. It was Page's eleventh year overall as part of the network crew. Lou Palmer reported from victory lane. Luke Walton introduced the starting command during the pre-race ceremonies, but did not have on-air duties during the race itself.

Bob Forbes spent the early segments of the race covering the center pits, then spent the second half of the race concentrating on covering the garage area and track hospital. Sally Larvick was once again used in a limited role, conducting interviews. She also reported from the track hospital in the early portions of the race. This was the last year of the Backstretch reporter. The Backstretch reporter would return for a two-year period from 1989 to 1990 but have a very limited role both years.

This would be the final 500 on the crew for Doug Zink, who debuted in 1966. Zink died April 3, 2016.

Television
The race was carried in the United States on ABC Sports on a same-day tape delay basis. Jackie Stewart served as the host position in "ABC Race Central" for the final time. Jack Arute joined the crew as a pit reporter, a position he would hold for over 20 years. After 1983, Chris Economaki left ABC, and joined CBS for the Daytona 500 and other NASCAR events. Larry Nuber debuted as a pit reporter in his first Indy assignment, and ABC News and ABC Sports correspondent Ray Gandolf supplied in-depth features.

A new camera angle was introduced for this broadcast, located on the start's stand over the shoulder of the flagman. The angle would be used at the dropping of the green flag as well as the finish.

The race was televised in Brasil for the first time, as the debut of former Formula One champion Emerson Fittipaldi attracted national interest. Record aired the race with Emerson's father Wilson Fittipaldi as announcer. 

The broadcast has re-aired on ESPN Classic since May 2011.

Gallery

Notes

See also
 1983-84 USAC Championship Car season

References

Works cited
1984 Indianapolis Day-To-Day Trackside Report for the Media: Indianapolis Motor Speedway
1984 Indianapolis 500 Telecast: ABC-TV, May 27, 1984
Indianapolis 500 History: Race & All-Time Stats - Official Site
1984 Indianapolis 500 Radio Broadcast, Indianapolis Motor Speedway Radio Network

Indianapolis 500 races
Indianapolis 500
Indianapolis 500
Indianapolis 500